The Fourteen Infallibles in Twelver Shia Islam are the Islamic prophet Muhammad, his daughter Fatima Zahra, and the Twelve Imams. All are considered to be infallible under the theological concept of Ismah. Accordingly, they have the power to commit sin but by their nature are able to avoid doing so, which is regarded as a miraculous gift from God. The Infallibles are believed to follow only God's desire in their actions because of their supreme righteousness, consciousness, and love for God. They are also regarded as being immune to error in practical matters, in calling people to religion, and in the perception of divine knowledge. Some Twelver Shia believe the Fourteen Infallibles are superior to the rest of creation and to the other major prophets.

Family tree

List of the Infallibles

See also 

 Shia Islam
 Twelvers
 Ahl al-Bayt
 Ahl al-Kisa
 Twelve Imams
 Imamat doctrine
 Ismah
 Criticism of Twelver Shia Islam#Infallibility of Imams
 Salawat

Notes

References

Sources
 Encyclopedias
 
 
 
 
 
 
 
 
 
 
 
 
 
 
 
 

 Books

External links
 A Chronological List of the Fourteen Infallibles
 A Brief History of the Fourteen Infallibles by WOFIS World Organization for Islamic Services Tehran -Iran
 The Brief History of the Fourteen Infallibles by Mohammad Hussein il’adeeb

 
 
Twelver theology
Islam-related lists
Lists of Muslims
Muslim family trees
Islamic terminology
Family of Muhammad
Banu Hashim
Imamate